Ibn-e-Safi (26 July 1928 – 26 July 1980) (also spelled as Ibne Safi)  was the pen name of Asrar Ahmad, a fiction writer, novelist and poet of Urdu from Pakistan. The word Ibn-e-Safi is a Persian expression which literally means Son of Safi, where the word Safi means chaste or righteous. He first wrote from the British India of the 1940s, and later Pakistan after the independence of British India in 1947.

His main works were the 125-book series Jasoosi Dunya (The Spy World) and the 120-book Imran Series, with a small canon of satirical works and poetry. His novels were characterised by a blend of mystery, adventure, suspense, violence, romance and comedy, achieving massive popularity across a broad readership in South Asia.

Biography

Early life and education
Asrar Ahmad was born on 26 July 1928 in the town 'Nara' of district Allahabad, India. His father's name was Safiullah and mother's name was Naziran Bibi. His ancestors were Hindus of the Kayashta community, specialized in the fields of education and administration, who converted to Islam many generations ago.

He received a Bachelor of Arts degree from Agra University. In 1948, he started his first job at 'Nikhat Publications' as an editor in the poetry department. His initial works date back to the early 1940s, when he wrote from British India. He also studied at Allahabad University where he was class fellow of Professor Mohammad Uzair and one year senior to Mustafa Zaidi . After the independence of India and Pakistan in 1947, he began writing novels in the early 1950s while working as a secondary school teacher and continuing part-time studies. After completing the latter, having attracted official attention as being subversive in the independence and post-independence period, he migrated to Karachi, Sindh, Pakistan in August 1952. He started his own company by the name 'Asrar Publications'.

Later life
He married Umme Salma Khatoon in 1953. In the period from 1960 to 1963, he suffered an episode of severe depression and spent some time in the psychiatry ward of a hospital, but recovered, and returned with a best-selling Imran Series novel, Dairrh Matwaalay (One and a half amused) which was launched in India by to-be Prime Minister Lal Bahadur Shastri. In fact, he wrote 36 novels of 'Jasoosi Duniya' and 79 novels of 'Imran Series' after his recovery from depression. In the 1970s, he informally advised the Inter-Services Intelligence of Pakistan on methods of detection.

Death
Ibne Safi died on 26 July 1980 of pancreatic cancer at age 52. He was buried in Paposhnagar graveyard in Karachi.

Literary career

Early attempts 
Ibn-e-Safi started writing poetry in his childhood and soon earned critical acclaim in whole South-Asian community.  After completing his Bachelor of Arts, he started writing short stories, humour and satire under various names such as "Siniki (Cynic) Soldier" and "Tughral Farghan."  In the Nakhat magazines, he published several satirical articles which commented on various topics ranging from politics to literature to journalism.  His early works in the 1940s included short stories, humour and satire.

Jasoosi Dunya and Imran Series 
According to one of his autobiographical essays, someone in a literary meeting claimed that Urdu literature had little scope for anything but sexual themes. To challenge this notion, Ibn-e-Safi began writing detective stories in January 1952 in the monthly Nikhat, naming the series Jasoosi Dunya. In 1953, Ibn-e-Safi, along with his mother and sister, moved to Karachi, Pakistan to join his father who had migrated there earlier in 1947.

In 1955, Ibn-e-Safi started the Imran Series, which gained as much fame and success as Jasoosi Dunya. Ibne Safi's novels – characterized by a blend of adventure, suspense, violence, romance, and comedy – achieved massive popularity by a broad readership.

Many a time, Ibne Safi created fictitious settings for his stories. The magical web of his writing is so captivating that these fantasy lands have become real in the minds of readers. Avid fans of the author are experts on the people and cultures of Shakraal, Karaghaal, Maqlaaq, Zeroland, and many other imaginary domains. In cities around India and Pakistan, one can find discothèques, bars, nightclubs, and hotels named after venues found in Ibne Safi's novels. Some places worth mentioning are Dilkusha, Figaro, Niagara, Tip Top, High Circle.

Other works 
Besides humor and satire, he also wrote some short adventures, namely Baldraan Ki Malika (The Queen of Baldraan), Ab Tak Thee Kahaan? (Where had you been?), Shumal Ka Fitna (The Trouble from North), Gultarang, and Moaziz Khopri. In these adventures, Ibne Safi takes the reader to various fictitious, exotic lands of his own imagination.

In 1959, Ibne Safi started writing Aadmi Ki Jarain, a book based on human psychology. However, it remained incomplete due to his illness.

Dhamaka – A film by Ibn-e-Safi

Ibne Safi wrote the story and screenplay for a film 'Dhamaka' based on his novel 'Bebakon ki talash'. The film did not get the publicity and fame which it deserved and remains mostly forgotten.

"Dhamaka" was produced by Muhammad Hussain Talpur, based on the Imran Series novel Baibaakon Ki Talaash (Urdu for (In Search of the Outreageous).  Pakistani film actor Javed Sheikh (then known as Javaid Iqbal) was introduced as Zafarul Mulk, the lead role in the film. Muhammad Hussain Talpur (film producer) played the role of Jameson and actress Shabnam played the role of Sabiha. Imran and X-2's team was not shown in the movie. The voice of X-2 was recorded by Ibne Safi himself. Actor Rehman played the role of a villain for the first time. The film featured a rendition of a ghazal by the singer Habib Wali Mohammed, "Rah-e-talab mein kaun kisi ka", which was written by Ibn-e-Safi. The movie was released on 13 December 1974.

Reception

Influence
The Bollywood screenwriter and lyricist Javed Akhtar was greatly inspired by Ibn-e-Safi's Urdu novels, which he grew up reading as a child. Akhtar was particularly influenced by the Jasoosi Dunya and Imran series of detective novels, such as The House of Fear (1955). He was influenced by the fast action, tight plots and economies of expression in the Jasoosi Dunya detective thrillers. He also remembered Ibn-e-Safi's novels for their fascinating characters with catchy memorable names, which left a lasting impression on Akhtar, whose Bollywood scripts later employed some of Ibn-e-Safi's narrative techniques, such as giving catchy names to the characters, his sense of plot, and speaking styles. Akhtar said that Ibn-e-Safi's novels taught him the importance of larger-than-life characters, inspiring famous Bollywood characters such as Gabbar Singh in film Sholay (1975) and Mogambo in Mr. India (1987).

Translations
The first English translations of Ibne Safi's mystery novels began appearing in 2010, with The House of Fear from the Imraan Series, translated by Bilal Tanweer and published by Random House India. In 2011, Blaft Publications in association with Tranquebar released four more novels, this time from the Jasoosi Duniya series, translated by the highly acclaimed Urdu critic Shamsur Rahman Faruqi.

Bibliography
List of his non-series work
 Aadmi ki Jarain (Urdu for The Roots of The Man) – Incomplete
 baldaraan ki malikaa (Urdu for The Queen of Baldaraan)
 Ab tak thee kahaan (Urdu for Where Had You Been?)
 Diplomat murgh (Urdu for The Diplomat Rooster)
 saarhe paanch baje (Urdu for Half Past Five)
 tuzke do-piazi (Urdu for The autobiography of Do-Piaza) – Incomplete
 shumaal ka fitna (Urdu for The Trouble From North)
 mata-e Qalb-O-Nazar – Collection of Poetry (to be published)

Novels
 Allama Dahshatnak (Doctor Dread)
 Alfansey
 Khatarnak Lashein (The Laughing Corpse)
 Saanpon Ke Shikari
 Khaufnak Imarat (The House Of Fear) (1955)
 Purasrar Cheekhein (1955)
 Larkiyon Ka Jazirah
 Neelay Parindey
 Batil Qiyamat
 Jaron Ki Talash
 Chatanon Mein Fire (Shootout At The Rocks) (1955)

Poetry
(Note: Most of the English translations of Urdu poetry and titles are literal and do not capture the true essence of the language. Some meaning is definitely lost in translation.)

Ibn-e-Safi was also a poet. He used to write poems under the pen name of "Asrar Narvi". He wrote in various genres of Urdu poetry, such as Hamd, Na`at, Manqabat, Marsia, Ghazal, and Nazm. His collection of poetry, Mata-e Qalb-o-Nazar (Urdu or in English (The Assets of Heart & Sight), remains unpublished.

Following is the list of his Ghazals:

 Daulat-e-Gham (Urdu (The wealth of sorrow)
 Zahan se Dil ka Bar Utra Hai (Urdu (Heaviness of the heart is unloaded by the mind)
 Chhalakti aayay (Urdu (The liquor shows up overflowing)
 Kuch to ta-alluq ... (Urdu (Some affiliation ...)
 Aaj ki raat (Urdu (Tonight)
 Baday ghazab ka ... (Urdu  (Of Much Might ...)
 Yun hi wabastagi (Urdu (Casual connection)
 Lab-o-rukhsar-o-jabeen (Urdu (Lips and Cheeks and forehead)
 Rah-e-talab mein kaun kisi ka (Urdu (In the path of demands, no one recognises anyone)
 Kuch bhi to apne paas nahin ... (Urdu (Do not have anything ...)
 Aay nigaraan-e-khoobroo (Urdu (Gorgeous Sculptures)
 Kabhi sawab ki hain ... (Urdu  (Sometimes, of virtuousness ...)
 Kabhi qatil ... (Urdu for Sometimes killer ...)
 Qafas ki daastaan hai ... (Urdu (It is the tale of imprisonment ...)
 Maan (Urdu (Mother)
 Shakist-e-talism (Urdu  (Defeat of the Magic)
 Talism-e-hosh-ruba (Urdu  (The Breath-taking Magic)
 Tanhayee (Urdu  (Solitude)
 Bansuri Ki Aawaz (Urdu (The Sound of Flute)

Awards and recognition
Sitara-i-Imtiaz (Star of Excellence) Award by the President of Pakistan in 2020

See also
 List of Pakistani writers
 Jasoosi Dunya
 Imran Series
 List of Jasoosi Dunya
 List of Imran Series
 The House of Fear

References

External links
 Ibn e Safi The Master Craftman
 Ibne Safi's literary place and status BBC Urdu Service, 23 July 2011
 Aik Hero Ajmad Islam Amjad's Column on Ibne Safi's 32nd death anniversary at Daily Express (newspaper) in Urdu language

 
1928 births
1980 deaths
Pakistani spy fiction writers
Muhajir people
Pakistani poets
Pakistani novelists
Pakistani Muslims
Jasoosi Dunya
Imran Series
Writers from Karachi
Writers from Allahabad
20th-century novelists
20th-century Urdu-language writers
Urdu-language writers from British India
Urdu-language novelists
Urdu-language fiction writers
20th-century poets
Recipients of Sitara-i-Imtiaz
Detective fiction writers
Dr. Bhimrao Ambedkar University alumni
University of Allahabad alumni